The Orville Jackson House in Eagle, Idaho, is a brick and stucco, -story Tudor Revival structure designed by Tourtellotte and Hummel and constructed in 1932. The house features a decorative diamond pattern of clinker brick visible on the chimney. Projecting clinkers are evident also in the brickwork of the first floor outer walls. The house was added to the National Register of Historic Places in 1982.

Orville Jackson owned Orville Jackson's pharmacy in Eagle from 1922 until 1974.

References

External links
 

		
National Register of Historic Places in Ada County, Idaho
Residential buildings completed in 1932
Tudor Revival architecture in Idaho
Tourtellotte & Hummel buildings